is the Japanese art of flower arrangement. The tradition dates back to Heian period (794–1185), when floral offerings were made at altars.

 reached its first zenith in the 16thcentury under the influence of Buddhist tea masters and has grown over the centuries, with numerous distinct schools extant today.

Etymology 

History 

With the introduction of Buddhism, offering flowers at Buddhist altars became common. Although the lotus is widely used in India where Buddhism originated, in Japan other native flowers for each season were selected for this purpose. While in China the Buddhist priests were the first instructors of flower arrangement, in Japan they only introduced its crudest elements.

For a long time the art of flower arranging had no meaning, and functioned as merely the placing in vases the flowers to be used as temple offerings and before ancestral shrines, without system or meaningful structure. A huge branch of pine or cryptomeria stood in the middle, with three or five seasonable flowers placed around it. These branches and stems were put in vases in upright positions without attempting artificial curves. Generally symmetrical in form, these arrangements appeared in religious pictures in the 14thcentury, as the first attempt to represent natural scenery. The large tree in the centre represented distant scenery, plum or cherry blossoms middle distance, and little flowering plants the foreground. The lines of these arrangements were known as centre and sub-centre.

Later on, among other types of Buddhist offering, placing  became popular in the Kamakura (1185–1333) and Nanboku-chō periods (1336–1392). The  depicts lotus being offered by a monkey in front of a frog mimicking the Buddha.

Also displayed in these spaces were flower arrangements in vases that influenced the interior decorations, which became simpler and more exquisite over time. This style of decoration was called . The set of three ceremonial objects at the Buddhist altar called  consisted of candles lit in holders, a censer, and flowers in a vase. Recent historical research now indicates that the practice of  derived from a combination of belief systems, including Buddhist, and the Shinto  belief is most likely the origin of the Japanese practice of modern .

The art of flower arranging developed slowly, with many schools only coming into existence at the end of the 15thcentury following a period of the civil war.

Yoshimasa's contemporaries also contributed heavily to the development of flower arranging; the celebrated painter Sōami, a friend of Yoshimasa, conceived of the idea of representing the three elements of heaven, humans, and earth, from which grew the principles of arrangements used today.

Artists of the Kanō school, such as Sesshū Tōyō (1420–1506), Sesson, Kanō Masanobu, Kanō Motonobu (1476–1559), and Shugetsu of the 16thcentury, were lovers of nature, and  advanced a step further in this period beyond a form of temple and room decoration, with greater consideration given to the natural beauty of a floral arrangement.

Popularity of the two styles vacillated between these two for centuries. In the beginning,  was stiff, formal, and more decorative style, while  was simpler and more natural.

Although  began to come into favour in the Higashiyama period,  was still preferred, and  did not truly gain popularity until the Momoyama period, about a hundred years after Ashikaga Yoshimasa.

Both styles, despite having originated in the Higashiyama period, reflect the time periods in which they gained popularity, with  displaying the tastes of the Higashiyama period, and  the tastes of the Momoyama period.  lost some of its popularity during the Momoyama period, but in the first part of the Edo period (1603–1668) was revived, and became more popular than ever before. In the Higashiyama period,  had been used only as room decorations on ceremonial occasions, but now was followed as a fine art and looked upon as an accomplishment and pastime of the upper classes.  reached its greatest popularity during the Genroku era.

 has always been considered a dignified accomplishment. All of Japan's most celebrated generals notably practised flower arranging, finding that it calmed their minds and made their decisions on the field of action clearer; notable military practitioners include Toyotomi Hideyoshi, one of Japan's most famous generals.

A number of other texts documenting  also existed, though few contained directly instructional content; however, these books were fully illustrated, thus documenting the gradual progress of the art.

During the early Edo period (17th century), publications in Japan developed rapidly. The  was published in Kanbun 1 (1661). Although the text is similar to the contents of commentaries of the Muromachi period, the illustrations showed how to enjoy , which had spread from monks to warriors and further on to townspeople. The , published in Tenna 3 (1683), was the most famous  manual. The  came out Jōkyō 5 (1688).

In the Ken'ei era,  was simple and natural, with no extreme curves in the arrangement, but in the Genroku era, the lines became complicated and the forms pattern-like, following general trends of high artistic development and expression within that period; during the Genroku period, all the fine arts were highly developed, above all pattern-printing for fabrics and decoration. In the latter part of the 17thcentury, Korin, the famous lacquer artist known for his exquisite designs, strongly influenced . In this period, the combination of a pattern or design with lines that followed the natural growth of the plant produced the most pleasing and graceful results.

It was in the latter part of the 17thcentury that  was most practised and reached its highest degree of perfection as an art. Until then, only one branch of  had been taught at a time, following the taste of the day, but now rival teachers in both  and  existed.

 reached its greatest popularity in the Genroku era, and from then on commenced its decline.

After the Tenmei era, a formal and artificial form of arrangement developed. This form has a fixed rule or model known as "heaven, human, and earth". In the Mishō-ryū school, the form is called .

The most popular schools of today, including Ikenobō, Enshū-ryū, and Mishō-ryū, amongst others, adhere to these principles, but there are in Tokyo and Kyoto many masters of  who teach the simpler forms of Ko-ryū, and Ko-Shin-ryū of the Genroku and Tenmei eras.

The oldest international organisation, Ikebana International, was founded in 1956; Princess Takamado is the honorary president.

Practitioners 

A  teacher is called .

Noted Japanese practitioners include Junichi Kakizaki, Mokichi Okada, and Yuki Tsuji.

After the 2011 earthquake and tsunami devastated Japan, noted  practitioner Toshiro Kawase began posting images of his arrangements online every day in a project called "One Day, One Flower."

Her mother, Beverly Harden, was a practitioner of the Sōgetsu school. She later became also president of the Ikebana International Washington, DC chapter.

Schools 
The oldest of these schools, Ikenobō goes back to the 8th century (Heian period). This school marks its beginnings from the construction of the Rokkaku-dō in Kyoto, the second oldest Buddhist temple in Japan, built in 587 by Prince Shōtoku, who had camped near a pond in what is now central Kyoto, and enshrined a small statue of her.

During the 13thcentury, Ono-no-Imoko, an official state emissary, brought the practice of placing Buddhist flowers on an altar from China. He became a priest at the temple and spent the rest of his days practising flower arranging. The name 'Ikenobō', granted by the emperor, became attached to the priests there who specialised in altar arrangements.

Ikenobō is the only school that does not have the ending  in its name, as it is considered the original school. The first systematised classical styles, including , started in the middle of the 15thcentury. The first students and teachers were Ikenobō Buddhist priests and members of the Buddhist community. As time passed, other schools emerged, styles changed, and  became a custom among the whole of Japanese society.
 Shōgetsudo Ko-ryū – originated by the monk Myōe (1171–1231)
  – originated by Ōun Hoshi or Matsune Ishiro (1333–1402)
  – originated by  Ashikaga Yoshimasa (1436–1490), who was also called Higashiyama-dono or Jishō-in. Branches of this school are:
 Senzan-ryū
 Higashiyama-Ko-Sei-ryū
 
 
 Senke-Ko-ryū – originated by the famous tea master Sen no Rikyū in 1520
 Bisho-ryū – originated by Goto Daigakunokami or Bishokui Dokaku in 1545
  – originated by Lord Kobori Enshū (1579–1647). The branches of this school are numerous:
 Nihonbashi Enshū-ryū
 Shin Enshū-ryū
 Ango Enshū-ryū
 Miyako Enshū-ryū
 Seifu Enshū-ryū
 Asakusa Enshū-ryū, as well as many others.
 Ko-Shin-ryū – originated by Shin-tetsu-sai, who was the teacher of  Tokugawa Hidetada (1579–1632)
 Sekishu-ryū – originated by Katagiri Iwaminokami Sadamasa (1604–1673)
 Jikei-ryū – originated by Shōuken Jikei in the year 1699
 Senkei-ryū – founded around 1669 by Senkei Tomiharunoki
 Tōgen-Ryu – commenced by Togensai Masayasu about 1716
 Sōgensai
 Murakumo-ryū
 Tōko-ryū
 Shikishima-ryū
 Dōnin-ryū
 Gengi-ryū – commenced by Chiba Ryōboku in the year 1772
  – founded by Ippo Mishōsai (1761–1824) in Osaka
 Yōshin Go-ryū – developed during the Edo period
 Sei-ryū – commenced by Dōseiken Ittoku in 1818
 Shōko-ryū – commenced by Hakusuisai in the year 1896
  – founded in 1895 by Ohara Unshin
  – founded in 1927 by Teshigahara Sofu
  – founded in the 1930s with roots dating back to Emperor Saga, who reigned from 809–823 CE
  – founded in 1937

Theory 

Since flower arrangement arrived in Japan from China together with Buddhism, it was naturally imbued with Chinese and Buddhist philosophy. The Buddhist desire to preserve life lies at the root of much of  practice, and has created most of the rules of flower arrangement, controlling also the shapes of the flower vases, formed as to help to prolong the life of the flowers. Consideration of the vase as being something more than a mere holder of the flowers is also an important consideration. The surface of the water is always exposed, alongside the surface of the earth from which the grouping of flowers springs. This aids in creating the effect of representing a complete plant growing as nearly as possible in its natural conditions.

More than simply putting flowers in a container,  is a disciplined art form in which nature and humanity are brought together. Contrary to the idea of a particoloured or multicoloured arrangement of blossoms,  often emphasises other areas of the plant, such as its stems and leaves, and puts emphasis on shape, line, and form. Though  is an expression of creativity, certain rules govern its form, such as the idea of good and evil fortune in the selection of material and form of the arrangement.

For instance, the colours of some flowers are considered unlucky. Red flowers, which are used at funerals, are undesirable for their morbid connotations, but also because red is supposed to suggest the red flames of a fire. An odd number of flowers is lucky, while even numbers are unlucky and therefore undesirable, and never used in flower arrangements. With odd numbers, symmetry and equal balance is avoided, a feature actually seldom found in nature, and which from the Japanese standpoint is never attractive in art of any description. These create a specific impression of nature, and convey the artist's intention behind each arrangement is shown through a piece's colour combinations, natural shapes, graceful lines, and the implied emotional meaning of the arrangement without the use of words. All flower arrangements given as gifts are given with the flowers in bud, so that the person to whom they are sent may have the pleasure of seeing them open, in contrast to the Western idea of flower arrangements, where the flowers are already in bloom before being given.

There is no occasion which cannot be suggested by the manner in which the flowers are arranged. For instance, leaving home can be announced by an unusual arrangement of flowers; auspicious materials, such as willow branches, are used to indicate hopes for a long and happy life, and are particularly used for arrangements used to mark a parting, with the length of the branch signifying a safe return from a long journey, particularly if a branch is made to form a complete circle. For a house-warming, white flowers are used, as they suggest water to quench a fire; traditional Japanese homes, being made almost exclusively of wood, were particularly susceptible to fire, with everything but the roof being flammable. To celebrate an inheritance, all kinds of evergreen plants or chrysanthemums may be used, or any flowers which are long-lived, to convey the idea that the wealth or possessions may remain forever. There are also appropriate arrangements for sad occasions. A flower arrangement made to mark a death is typically constructed of white flowers, with some dead leaves and branches, arranged to express peace.

Some arrangements may consist of only a minimal number of blooms interspersed among stalks and leaves. The structure of some Japanese flower arrangements is based on a scalene triangle delineated by three main points, usually twigs, considered in some schools to symbolise heaven, human, and earth, or sun, moon, and earth. Use of these terms is limited to certain schools and is not customary in more traditional schools. A notable exception is the traditional  form, which follows other precepts. The container can be a key element of the composition, and various styles of pottery may be used in their construction. In some schools, the container is only regarded as a vessel to hold water, and should be subordinate to the arrangement.

The seasons are also expressed in flower arrangements, with flowers grouped differently according to the time of the year. For example, in March, when high winds prevail, the unusual curves of the branches convey the impression of strong winds. In summer, low, broad flower receptacles are used, where the visually predominant water produces a cooler and more refreshing arrangement than those of upright vases.

Some practitioners feel silence is needed while constructing a flower arrangement, while others feel this is not necessary, though both sides commonly agree that flower arranging is a time to appreciate aspects of nature commonly overlooked in daily life. It is believed that practice of flower arranging leads a person to become more patient and tolerant of differences in nature and in life, providing relaxation in mind, body and soul, and allowing a person to identify with beauty in all art forms.

Plants play an important role in the Japanese Shinto religion.  are objects that divine spirits are summoned to.

Styles 

 in the beginning was very simple, constructed from only a very few stems of flowers and evergreen branches. Patterns and styles evolved, and by the late 15thcentury arrangements were common enough to be appreciated by ordinary people and not only by the imperial family and its retainers, styles of  having changed during that time, transforming the practice into an art form with fixed instructions. Books were written about the art,  being the oldest of these, covering the years 1443 to 1536.  became a major part of traditional festivals, and exhibitions were occasionally held.

The first styles were characterised by a tall, upright central stem accompanied by two shorter stems. During the Momoyama period, 1560–1600, a number of splendid castles were constructed, with noblemen and royal retainers making large, decorative  floral arrangements that were considered appropriate decoration for castles. Many beautiful  arrangements were used as decoration for castles during the Momoyama period, and were also used for celebratory reasons.
 The ; style was developed as a Buddhist expression of the beauty of landscapes in nature. Key to this style are nine branches that represent elements of nature. One of  arrangement styles is called .

When the tea ceremony emerged, another style was introduced for tea ceremony rooms called . This style is the opposite of the Momoyama style and emphasises rustic simplicity.  is not considered a style of  but is separate.
It is characterised by a tight bundle of stems that form a triangular three-branched asymmetrical arrangement that was considered classic. It is also known by the short form .
It is a simple style that is designed to show the beauty and uniqueness of the plant itself. Formalisation of the  style for use in the Japanese alcove resulted in the formal  style.
 In the  style, creative design of flower arranging is emphasised, with any material permissible for use, including non-flower materials. In the 20th century, with the advent of modernism, the three schools of  partially gave way to what is commonly known in Japan as "Free Style".
 Kyoto Ikebana artist Hayato Nishiyama says he enjoys designs with just a single flower, "to help people concentrate, to help them focus on seeing the beauty of an individual."

Gallery

Vessels 

The receptacles used in flower arranging come in a large variety. They are traditionally considered not only beautiful in form, material, and design but are made to suit the use to which they will be put, so that a flower can always be placed in an appropriate receptacle, and probably in one especially designed for that particular sort of flower.

The thing the Japanese most seek in a vase's shape is what will best prolong the life of flowers. For this reason, vases are wide open at the mouth, for, unlike in Western flower arranging, they do not depend upon the vase itself to hold flowers in position, believing that the oxygen entering through the neck opening is as necessary to the plant as the oxygen it receives directly from the water; thus, the water remains sweet much longer than in small-necked vases.

There are many ideas connected with these receptacles. For instance, hanging vases came into use through the idea that flowers presented by an esteemed friend should not be placed where they could be looked down upon, so they were raised and hung. In hanging bamboo vases, the large, round surface on top is supposed to represent the moon, and the hole for the nail a star.

Besides offering variety in the form of receptacles, the low, flat vases, more used in summer than winter, make it possible to arrange plants of bulbous and water growth in natural positions.

As for the colour of the vases, the soft pastel shades are common, and bronze vases are especially popular. To the Japanese, the colour bronze seems most like mother earth, and therefore best suited to enhance the beauty of flowers.

Bamboo, in its simplicity of line and neutral colour, makes a charming vase, but one of solid bamboo is not practical in some countries outside of Japan, where the dryness of the weather causes it to split. Baskets made from bamboo reeds, with their soft brown shades, provide a pleasing contrast to the varied tints of the flowers, and are practical in any climate.

Not to be overlooked is the tiny hanging vase found in the simple peasant homesome curious root picked up at no cost and fashioned into a shape suitable to hold a single flower or vine. Such vases can be made with little effort by anyone and can find place nearly anywhere.

In popular culture 
  is taught in schools. It has also featured in manga, anime and been shown on television.
 In Magic-kyun! Renaissance, the main character Aigasaki Kohana practices , just like her mother before her.
 The  manga Zig Zag focuses on a boy named Takaaki Asakura (nicknamed "Taiyou" (the sun)) and his affection for flowers.
She combines her passion for it with tanks. A limited special edition vase in the shape of a tank was made by a Kasama ware kiln that was seen in the anime.
 In 1957 the film director and grand master of the Sōgetsu-ryū school of Ikebana Hiroshi Teshigahara made the movie titled , which describes his school.
 Flower and Sword, released in 2017, tells the story of the development of  during the Sengoku period in the 16thcentury. Directed by Tetsuo Shinohara, it was based on a novel by Tadashi Onitsuka.

See also 

 Wabi-sabi
 Floral design
 Birth flower
 Language of flowers
 Plant symbolism
 Flower frog/

References

Further reading 
 Ember, M., & Ember, C. R. (2001). Countries and their Cultures. New York Pearson Education, Inc. Retrieved 30 July 2008, from NetLibrary (UMUC Database) .

External links 

 Ikebana International
 Ikebana Wiki

Japanese words and phrases
 
Decorative arts